Georgiy Nikolayevich Daneliya (25 August 1930 – 4 April 2019), also known as Giya Daneliya, was a Soviet and Georgian film director and screenwriter of Georgian origin. He was named a People's Artist of the USSR in 1989 and a laureate of the State Prize of the Russian Federation in 1997.

Early life
Georgiy Daneliya was born in Tbilisi into a Georgian family. His father Nikolai Dmitrievich Danelia (1902–1981) came from peasants. He moved to Moscow following the October Revolution, finished the Moscow State University of Railway Engineering and joined Mosmetrostroy where he spent the rest of his life working as an engineer and a manager at different levels. Georgiy's mother Maria Ivlianovna Anjaparidze (1905–1980) belonged to a noble Anjaparidze family known since the 13th century and recognized by the Russian Empire in 1880. She worked as a film director, a second unit director and an assistant director at the Tbilisi Film Studio and Mosfilm. Her sister (Daneliya's aunt) Veriko Anjaparidze was a popular Georgian stage and cinema actress who was married to Mikheil Chiaureli, a prominent Soviet film director. Their daughter Sofiko Chiaureli was also a famous actress who later starred in Daneliya's comedy Don't Grieve along with her mother.

In a year after Daneliya's birth his family moved to Moscow where he grew up and entered the primary school. By the time the Great Patriotic War started he and his mother were staying at their relatives in Tbilisi where they spent the next two years. His father was sent to the front line to build underground command and control centers. He didn't take part in battles, but was still awarded the rank of major general for his work. In 1943 the family reunited back in Moscow.

Career
Daneliya started his career by playing episodic roles in several movies directed by his uncle Mikheil Chiaureli. In 1955 he graduated from the Moscow Architecture Institute and worked as an architect for the next two years. In 1956 the Higher Director's Courses were founded at the Mosfilm Studio, and Daneliya decided to enter them. His course was led by Mikhail Kalatozov, also a good friend of his mother. He graduated in 1959 and joined Mosfilm the same year.

His first feature Seryozha (also known as Splendid Days outside of the Soviet Union) was co-written and co-directed by his friend Igor Talankin. It was based on the popular novel of the same name by a prominent Soviet writer Vera Panova and featured Sergei Bondarchuk and his wife Irina Skobtseva in the leading roles. The movie was well-received, and the same year it was sent to the Karlovy Vary International Film Festival where it was awarded with the Crystal Globe.

In 1963 Daneliya invited a young talent Gennady Shpalikov to collaborate on his first comedy film. By that time Shpalikov had already fallen out of favour for writing Ilyich's Gate, a movie which Nikita Khrushchev compared to an ideological diversion. To avoid censorship, Danelia paid a visit to Vladimir Baskakov, one of the head officials at the State Committee for Cinematography, and assured him they had nothing tricky on their minds. After that the work became "easy, fast and fun". They ended up with a movie Walking the Streets of Moscow inspired by the French New Wave, similar to Ilyich's Gate in style and mood. This alarmed the Artistic Council, an executive body responsible for pre-production and post-production. They saw no point in the movie. Daneliya and Shaplikov then came up with a "meaningful" episode (a floor polisher who works at the house of a big writer and criticizes beginning writers on this account), mocking the Council along the way, and a new genre of "lyric (or sad) comedy" which became Daneliya's trademark.

The movie starred Nikita Mikhalkov in his first major role and became one of the most characteristic films of the Khrushchev Thaw. It was widely praised and officially selected for the 1964 Cannes Film Festival. Nevertheless, Daneliya's next work Thirty Three, a satirical comedy that made fun of the Khrushchev era, wasn't tolerated and became quickly banned from theaters after its initial release in 1965. According to Daneliya, it was still showed at small theaters and various clubs throughout the 1970s, so that by the time the so-called glasnost was proclaimed, it turned out that "everyone had managed to watch my super-banned movie".

Daneliya decided to switch back to his sad comedies instead of straight-up satire. The following years he produced a whole number of highly successful movies that established him as one of the leading Soviet comedy directors. Among his most famous works were Afonya (1975) about an unlucky plumber, Mimino (1977) about a Georgian pilot's adventures in Moscow, The Autumn Marathon (1979) about a translator vacillating between his wife and mistress, it won the main prize at the San Sebastian Film Festival. In Gentlemen of Fortune (1971) Daneliya acted as a creative director and a screenwriter.

Gentlemen of Fortune gathered 65 million viewers on the year of release and became the 12th most viewed Soviet film, while Afonya was seen by 62.2 million people, reaching the 15th place. Mimino won the Golden Prize at the 10th Moscow International Film Festival. The Autumn Marathon received the Golden Shell at the 1979 San Sebastián International Film Festival as well as two Pasinetti Awards at the 36th Venice International Film Festival.

In 1976 he was a member of the jury at the 26th Berlin International Film Festival. In 1986 Daneliya directed a cult classic sci-fi film Kin-dza-dza!.

More recently, he was involved in an animation project Ku! Kin-dza-dza! (a straight remake of his earlier work Kin-dza-dza!) and was given the Lifetime Achievement Award by the Russian Academy of Cinema Arts. Between 2003 and 2015 he also published a trilogy of memoirs entitled "A Passenger Without a Ticket", "Toasted Drains To the Dregs" and "The Cat Is Gone, But the Smile Is Left". They are written in a typical Danelian manner, mixing laugh-out-loud anecdotes with some sad memories and lyrical life stories.

Personal life
Daneliya was officially married two times. His first wife (1951–1956) was Irina Ginzburg, a lawyer, daughter of a high-ranking Soviet official Semyon Ginzburg, at the time a Deputy Minister of Oil Industry of the USSR. They had a daughter Svetlana Daneliya who also became a lawyer. Between 1957 and 1984 Daneliya lived in a civil union with an acclaimed Russian actress Lyubov Sergeyevna Sokolova who appeared in a number of his movies. They had a son Nikolai Sokolov-Daneliya (1959–1985), a film director and a poet who died at the age of 26 following an "accident". Some claimed it was a drug overdose. Shortly before his death Daneliya left the family for Galina Ivanovna Yurkova (born 1944), a film director and his regular collaborator since then. He adopted her son Kirill (born 1968) and gave him his surname; Kirill became an artist. Daneliya has six grandchildren.

In 1980, Georgiy Daneliya survived a clinical death after being diagnosed with peritonitis and spent a year in hospital. In his final years, he rarely left his apartment. According to his wife Galina Yurkova-Daneliya, he had been suffering from a progressing chronic obstructive pulmonary disease for many years.

Trademarks
Similar to Leonid Gaidai and Eldar Ryazanov, Daneliya co-wrote screenplays to the majority of his movies (sometimes uncredited) and introduced many distinguishing trademarks in the process. After Thirty Three (1965) Yevgeny Leonov turned into his close friend and "a lucky charm". For 30 years Leonov appeared in every movie directed by Daneliya, including several Fitil episodes, either in the leading, supporting or episodic roles. He also played the dual role in Gentlemen of Fortune. Their last collaboration was Nastya (1993) released shortly before Leonov's death.

The traditional Russian song "At the river, at the river, on the other shore Marusenka washed her white legs" performed by Leonov's character in Thirty Three also became their trademark song. According to the director, it was the only song he could recall at the time, and Leonov loved it immensely. It could be heard in all Daneliya's movies that feature Leonov, with the exception of Hopelessly Lost. It's not always easy to spot though, as it is performed by different people, in different languages, sometimes even whistled.

Many of Daneliya's films also featured his Georgian friend Vakhtang Kikabidze. The dual role of Yakov and Merab Papashvili in Passport was also written with Kikabidze in mind, but French producers insisted that it should be given to a French actor (Gérard Darmon played the part).

Starting with Don't Grieve (1969) every one of Daneliya's movies also featured a mysterious man named R. Khobua listed in the "Credits" section among episodic actors. Rene Khobua was in fact a simple Georgian builder whom Daneliya and Gabriadze accidentally met while working on the screenplay for Don't Grieve. They decided to "test" different versions of screenplay on a regular viewer who agreed to listen. After several days of intensive "testing" it turned out that Khobua didn't understand a thing because of his poor Russian, and that he arrived with an urgent task from his employees, but was too shy to mention it. Daneliya then decided to insert Khobua's name in all of his movies that followed.

Daneliya's movies regularly refer to previous ones he had made. For example, an angry man from Walking the Streets of Moscow played by Rolan Bykov whistles a tune from Daneliya's previous film, The Road to Berth, while a fragment of the title song "I'm Walking the Streets of Moscow" could be heard in Thirty Three. The thief nicknamed Kosoi from Gentlemen of Fortune makes a cameo appearance in Nastya where he is also performed by Savely Kramarov in one of his last roles. The catchphrase "It's not wine, it's vinegar" from Don't Grieve was later repeated by the only Georgian character from Kin-dza-dza!, and the troll song from Tears Were Falling could be heard in Daneliya's latest film Ku! Kin-dza-dza.

Filmography

As director
 Vasisuali Lohankin (Васисуалий Лоханкин) (1958); short
 Also People (Тоже люди) (1959); short
 Splendid Days (Серёжа) (1960); co-directed with Igor Talankin
 The Road to Berth (Путь к причалу) (1962)
 Walking the Streets of Moscow (Я шагаю по Москве) (1963)
 Thirty Three (Тридцать три) (1965)
 Don't Grieve (Не горюй!) (1969)
 Hopelessly Lost (Совсем пропащий) (1972)
 Afonya (Афоня) (1975)
 Mimino (Мимино) (1977)
 Autumn Marathon (Осенний марафон) (1979)
 Tears Were Falling (Слёзы капали) (1982)
 Kin-dza-dza! (Кин-Дза-Дза!) (1986)
 Passport (Паспорт) (1990)
 Nastya (Настя) (1993)
 Heads and Tails (Орёл и Решка) (1995)
 Fortune (Фортуна) (2000)
 Ku! Kin-dza-dza! (Ку! Кин-дза-дза) (2013)

As screenwriter
1972 – Gentlemen of Fortune (Джентльмены удачи); with Viktoriya Tokareva
1988 – Frenchman (Француз); with Sergei Bodrov
1988 – Hello from Charlie the Trumpet player (Привет от Чарли Трубача); with Sergei Dernov

As actor
 1942 — Giorgi Saakadze (Георгий Саакадзе) as peasant boy
 1951 — The Unforgettable Year 1919 (Незабываемый 1919 год) as guitar player
 1955 — Mexican (Мексиканец) as guy with a guitar
 1963 — Walking the Streets of Moscow (Я шагаю по Москве) as shoeshine man
 1969 — Don't Grieve (Не горюй!) as station officer
 1971 — Gentlemen of Fortune (Джентльмены удачи) as passerby
 1977 — Mimino (Мимино) as commander of the crew of the aircraft «Tbilisi — Moscow»
 1979 — Autumn Marathon (Осенний марафон) as Otto Skorzeny, officer in a television movie that Buzykins are watching
 1982 — Tears Were Falling (Слёзы капали) as a passenger on the tram
 1986 — Kin-dza-dza! (Кин-дза-дза!) as Abradox, ruler of the planet Alpha
 1990 — Passport (Паспорт) as arab on a donkey
 1993 — Nastya (Настя) as cultural worker
 1995 — Heads and Tails (Орёл и решка) as design engineer
 2000 — Fortune (Фортуна) as kingpin
 2006 — Carnival Night 2 (Карнавальная ночь-2, или 50 лет спустя) as cameo appearance
 2013 — Ku! Kin-dza-dza (Ку! Кин-дза-дза) as Camomile / Diogenes (voices)

Bibliography
Georgiy Daneliya (2003). A Passenger Without a Ticket. — Moscow: Eksmo, 416 pages 
Georgiy Daneliya (2005). Toasted Drains To the Dregs. — Moscow: Eksmo, 352 pages 
Georgiy Daneliya (2008). Don't Grieve! — Moscow: AST  (a book of screenplays)
Georgiy Daneliya (2016). The Cat Is Gone, But the Smile Is Left. — Moscow: Eksmo, 416 pages

Honours and awards
Cannes Film Festival
 Winner in the category Special mention ribbons young filmmakers – 1964 – I Step Through Moscow
Nika Award
 1987 – The movie Kin-dza-dza
 1991 – nominated for "Best Screenplay" in the film Passport
 2008 – For the honour and dignity
Kinotavr
 1996 – Sochi, the Special Jury Prize, the movie Eagle and Tails
 1999 – Sochi, Russian President Award "for outstanding contribution to the development of Russian cinema"
 2000 – Sochi, the winner in the category of "President's Council Award", for the movie Fortune
All-Union Film Festival
 1964 – Diploma of the Komsomol, for the movie I Walk around Moscow
 1976 – Frunze, Special Jury Prize for Best Director, Film Afonya
 1980 – Dushanbe, the main prize, the film Autumn Marathon
Moscow International Film Festival
 1960 – Carlsbad, Grand Prize "Crystal Globe", the film Sergei
 1964 – Cannes, Winner of 'Special Mention ribbons of young directors, a film I Step Through Moscow
 1994 – Milan, the main prize, the film I Step Through Moscow
 1966 – Rome, the Special Prize of the Festival, the film I Step Through Moscow
 1970 – Mardel Plata, Special Jury Prize "Condor", the film Do not worry!
 1970 – Cartagena, Award for Best Actor, the film Do not worry!
 1975 – Tashkent, the main prize, the film Afonya
 1977 – Moscow, the main prize, the film Mimino
 1979 – Avelino, prize "Gold Lacheno" movie Mimino
 1979 – Venice Prize FIPRESCI, film Autumn Marathon
 1979 – San Sebastian, the main prize "Big Gold Sink", film Autumn Marathon
 1980 – Carlsbad, Prize of Soviet-Bulgarian friendship, the film Autumn Marathon
 1987 – Madrid, Special Jury Prize, the movie Kin-dza-dza
 1987 – Rio de Janeiro, a special jury prize, the movie Kin-dza-dza
 1987 – Porto, Special Jury Prize, the movie Kin-dza-dza
 1990 – Cannes, Spetsilny prize, the film Passport
 1993 – Rimini, The Prize "Amarcord", the movie Anastasia
 1996 – Rome Prize "Amarcord", the film Passport
 1996 – Warne, "Love and passion," the main prize, the movie Eagle and Tails
 1997 – St. Petersburg, the "Golden Ostap", nominated for "The Legend"
KF "Golden Duke"
 1990 – Odessa, Grand Prix, the film Passport
ICF comedy films
 1980 – Chamrousse, the main prize, the film Autumn Marathon
 1981 – Gabrovo, Special Award, the film Autumn Marathon
International review of films in Acapulco
 1960 – Prize "Golden Head of Palenque", film Sergei
"Golden laurel wreath" the Foundation David Oliver O. Selznick
 1961 – film Sergei
"Golden Aries"
 1995 – "Man Film of the Year"
State Prize of the Russian Federation
 1996 – movie Anastasia
 1996 – movie Heads and Tails
 1996 – film Passport
CCF VC
 1978 – Yerevan, prize for best comedy film, film Mimino
USSR State Prize
 1978 – The film Mimino
State Prize of the RSFSR Vasiliev brothers
 1981 – film Autumn Marathon
Prize "The Wanderer"
 2002 – St. Petersburg, nominated for "The Legend of fantastic cinema"
Award "Triumph"
  2002
KF "Viva Cinema of Russia!"
 2005 – St. Petersburg prize "Unfading viewers love"
Golden Eagle Award
 2005 – "For loyalty to the profession"
MF debut film "The Spirit of Fire"
 2006 – The main prize – "Golden Taiga", "For his contribution to cinema"
State Awards
 Honored Artist of the RSFSR (1965)
 People's Artist of the RSFSR (1974)
 People's Artist of the USSR (1989)
 Order "For Merit to the Fatherland":
2nd class (25 August 2010) – for outstanding contribution to the development of the domestic art of film and many years of creative activity
3rd class (29 August 2000) – for his great personal contribution to the development of cinema art
 USSR State Prize (1978) – for the film Mimino (1977)
 Vasilyev Brothers State Prize of the RSFSR (1981)
 Honorary Citizen of Tbilisi (1985)
 State Prize of the Russian Federation in the field of cinema in 1996 (29 May 1997) – for the feature films Passport, Anastasia, The Eagle and Tails
 Order of the Badge of Honour
 Order of the Red Banner of Labour
 Commander of the Order of Honour (Georgia) (2000)
 Russian President's Award for his contribution to cinema
 Honorary Member of Russian Academy of Arts
 Member of the USSR Union of Cinematographers

References

External links
 
  Film Director and Scriptwriter Georgiy Daneliya

1930 births
2019 deaths
Academicians of the National Academy of Motion Picture Arts and Sciences of Russia
Actors from Tbilisi
Film directors from Georgia (country)
High Courses for Scriptwriters and Film Directors alumni
Academic staff of High Courses for Scriptwriters and Film Directors
Honorary Members of the Russian Academy of Arts
Mingrelians
People's Artists of the RSFSR
People's Artists of the USSR
Recipients of the Nika Award
Recipients of the Order "For Merit to the Fatherland", 2nd class
Recipients of the Order "For Merit to the Fatherland", 3rd class
Recipients of the Order of Honor (Georgia)
Recipients of the Order of the Red Banner of Labour
Recipients of the USSR State Prize
Recipients of the Vasilyev Brothers State Prize of the RSFSR
State Prize of the Russian Federation laureates
Russian film directors
Russian memoirists
20th-century Russian screenwriters
Male screenwriters
20th-century Russian male writers
Soviet film directors
Soviet memoirists
Soviet screenwriters
Deaths from pneumonia in Russia
Burials at Novodevichy Cemetery